Tequendama Province is one of the 15 provinces in the Cundinamarca Department, Colombia.

Etymology 
The name Tequendama means in the Chibcha language of the Muisca; "he who precipitates downward".

Subdivision 
Tequendama Province comprises ten municipalities:
 San Antonio del Tequendama
 Anapoima
 Anolaima
 Apulo
 Cachipay
 El Colegio
 La Mesa
 Quipile
 Tena
 Viotá

References

Panorama 

Provinces of Cundinamarca Department
Province